On My Own Two Feet is the 1983 debut album by Paul Barrére. It features Steve Walsh from Kansas, Bill Payne from Little Feat and Keith Knudsen from The Doobie Brothers.

Track listing
 "Sweet Coquette"
 "High Roller"
 "Fool For You"
 "Love Sweet Love"
 "Who Knows For Sure"
 "She Lays Down The Beat"
 "Fortune Cookie"
 "Along This Lane"

Personnel
 Paul Barrére - guitar, bass, mandolin, percussion, vocals
 Andy West - bass
 Bobby LaKind - percussion
 Keith Knudsen - vocals
 T Lavitz - keyboards
 Bill Payne - keyboards
 Steve Walsh - keyboards
 Rod Morgenstein, Ferrel Gummit - drums
  Bill Bergman, David Stout, Greg Smith, Jerome Jumonville, Jim Coile, John Berry, Lee Thornburg - horns

References

1983 debut albums
Albums produced by Jeff Glixman